Lamar County is a county located in the west central portion of the U.S. state of Georgia. As of the 2020 census, the population was 18,500. The county seat is Barnesville.

Lamar County is included in the Atlanta-Sandy Springs-Roswell, GA Metropolitan Statistical Area.

History
The Georgia General Assembly proposed the constitutional amendment to create the county on August 17, 1920, and the citizens of the state voted in favor of the amendment on November 2, 1920.
Land from Pike County and Monroe County was then transferred to create Lamar County.
Lamar County was named after Confederate Democrat white supremacist Lucius Quintus Cincinnatus Lamar II.

Geography
It is located in the Piedmont region of the state.

The western third of Lamar County, west of a line from Orchard Hill through Milner and Barnesville, is located in the Upper Flint River sub-basin of the ACF River Basin (Apalachicola-Chattahoochee-Flint River Basin).  The eastern majority of the county is located in the Upper Ocmulgee River sub-basin of the Altamaha River basin.

Major highways

  Interstate 75
  U.S. Route 41
  U.S. Route 341
  State Route 7
  State Route 18
  State Route 36
  State Route 109
  State Route 401 (unsigned designation for I-75)

Adjacent counties
 Butts County (northeast)
 Monroe County (east)
 Upson County (southwest)
 Pike County (west)
 Spalding County (northwest)

Demographics

2000 census
As of the census of 2000, there were 15,912 people, 5,712 households, and 4,284 families living in the county. There were 6,145 housing units at an average density of 33 per square mile (13/km2). The racial makeup of the county was 67.78% White, 30.39% Black or African American, 0.28% Native American, 0.37% Asian, 0.01% Pacific Islander, 0.28% from other races, and 0.89% from two or more races.  1.08% of the population were Hispanic or Latino of any race.

There were 5,712 households, out of which 32.20% had children under the age of 18 living with them, 54.00% were married couples living together, 16.30% had a female householder with no husband present, and 25.00% were non-families. 21.60% of all households were made up of individuals, and 8.90% had someone living alone who was 65 years of age or older.  The average household size was 2.64 and the average family size was 3.05.

In the county, the population was spread out, with 24.50% under the age of 18, 11.40% from 18 to 24, 27.90% from 25 to 44, 23.60% from 45 to 64, and 12.60% who were 65 years of age or older.  The median age was 36 years. For every 100 females, there were 91.90 males.  For every 100 females age 18 and over, there were 88.90 males.

The median income for a household in the county was $37,087, and the median income for a family was $43,481. Males had a median income of $29,453 versus $21,933 for females. The per capita income for the county was $16,666.  About 8.10% of families and 11.20% of the population were below the poverty line, including 14.50% of those under age 18 and 11.00% of those age 65 or over.

2010 census
As of the 2010 United States Census, there were 18,317 people, 6,618 households, and 4,617 families living in the county. The racial makeup of the county was 66.0% white, 30.8% black or African American, 0.4% Asian, 0.3% American Indian, 0.8% from other races, and 1.7% from two or more races. Those of Hispanic or Latino origin made up 1.9% of the population. In terms of ancestry, 20.0% were American, 11.8% were English, 8.8% were Irish, and 6.0% were German.

Of the 6,618 households, 31.9% had children under the age of 18 living with them, 49.0% were married couples living together, 15.7% had a female householder with no husband present, 30.2% were non-families, and 25.6% of all households were made up of individuals. The average household size was 2.55 and the average family size was 3.04. The median age was 37.7 years.

The median income for a household in the county was $37,536 and the median income for a family was $42,218. Males had a median income of $37,535 versus $30,123 for females. The per capita income for the county was $17,725. About 19.4% of families and 20.4% of the population were below the poverty line, including 23.9% of those under age 18 and 17.4% of those age 65 or over.

2020 census

As of the 2020 United States census, there were 18,500 people, 6,494 households, and 3,746 families residing in the county.

Communities
 Aldora
 Barnesville (county seat)
 Milner

Politics

See also

 National Register of Historic Places listings in Lamar County, Georgia
List of counties in Georgia

References

External links
 County history

 
Georgia (U.S. state) counties
1920 establishments in Georgia (U.S. state)
Populated places established in 1920
Lamar